Ain Hussain is one of Yanbu Al-Nakhil villages, located in Yanbu, Al Madinah Region, Saudi Arabia.

The village is southwest of Medina, and north of Yanbu Al-Nakhil village.

Etymology 
The word "Ain" has different meanings in ِArabic. It would refer to: eye, threading hole, essence, substance, spy, guard, lookout, watch(man), interest, usury, spring or water well and more.

Ain Hussain refers to a spring named after Husayn ibn Ali (His name also spelled as "Husain", "Hussain" or "Hussein"), the grandson of Islamic Nabi, Muhammad.

References

External links
 موقع إمارة المدينة المنورة Medina Homepage
 موقع أمانة المدينة المنورة - البلديات - بلديات المحافظات - ينبع Medina Municipality

Populated places in Medina Province (Saudi Arabia)
Medina Province (Saudi Arabia)